Patrick "Pat" LaCroix (born 1938) is a Canadian musician and photographer.

Early life and education
LaCroix attended the Westlake College of Music in Los Angeles.

Career
While at college La Croix was part of The Four Winds vocal quartet with fellow student Gordon Lightfoot. He was a founding member of the folk band The Colonials, with Denny Doherty, Richard Byrne and Zal Yanovsky; the band later became The Halifax III. This group recorded two LP albums for Epic records in New York and performed on several national TV show in Canada and the US, including Sing Along With Mitch and The Merv Griffin Show.

In 1965, LaCroix began his commercial photographic career, and musically returned to his first love, singing Jazz.

LaCroix has received more the 60 awards for his photography and in 2008 was awarded The Lifetime Achievement award by the Canadian Association of Photographers and Illustrators in Communication. In 2017, LaCroix and Ted O'Reilly published Toronto Jazz Treasures, a coffee table book of photographic portraits of 100 of Toronto's best-known jazz musicians.

Personal life
He currently lives with his wife Naomi. He is the father of actress Lisa LaCroix and singer/songwriter, Dana LaCroix.

Discography

Folk period
 Magic Circle
 Halifax III (Album)San Francisco Bay Blues
 The Halifax III (album)
The Man Who Wouldn't Sing Along With Mitch (single)

Jazz period
 2002 - This is All I Ask 
 2005 - The Ballad Artistry of Pat LaCroix

References

External links
 

1938 births
Living people
Canadian jazz singers
Canadian photographers
Canadian folk singers